"Something Good" is a song written, produced, and performed by New Zealand singer Bic Runga. The song was released in New Zealand in 2002 and reached number four on the RIANZ Singles Chart. In 2003, "Something Good" received the Best Solo Video award from Juice TV. On 21 June 2004, the song was released in the United Kingdom as a maxi-single but failed to chart.

Track listings
New Zealand CD single
 "Something Good"
 "A Day Like Today"
 "Something Good" (Submariner mix featuring Tha Feelstyle)

UK maxi-CD single
 "Something Good"
 "Get Some Sleep" (BBC live version)
 "Wishing on a Star" (CSO live version)
 "Something Good" (video)

Charts

Release history

References

External links
 Bic's official website

2002 singles
2002 songs
Bic Runga songs
Columbia Records singles
Songs written by Bic Runga